Flávio de Souza Boaventura (born 12 July 1987) commonly known as Flávio Boaventura is a Brazilian footballer who plays as a centre-back for Portuguesa.

Career
On 11 December 2018, Boaventura joined Campeonato Paulista side Grêmio Novorizontino.

References

External links

Flávio Boaventura at Footballzz

1987 births
Living people
Brazilian footballers
Brazilian expatriate footballers
People from Feira de Santana
Association football central defenders
Sportspeople from Bahia
Joinville Esporte Clube players
Marília Atlético Clube players
Club Athletico Paranaense players
Paraná Clube players
ABC Futebol Clube players
Vila Nova Futebol Clube players
Grêmio Barueri Futebol players
F.C. Paços de Ferreira players
Flavio Boaventura
Clube de Regatas Brasil players
Grêmio Novorizontino players
Esporte Clube São Bento players
Sampaio Corrêa Futebol Clube players
América Futebol Clube (RN) players
Associação Portuguesa de Desportos players
Primeira Liga players
Flavio Boaventura
Brazilian expatriate sportspeople in Portugal
Brazilian expatriate sportspeople in Thailand
Expatriate footballers in Portugal
Expatriate footballers in Thailand